Phillip, Philip or Phil Scott may refer to:
 Phillip Scott (actor) (born 1952), Australian actor, singer, pianist, writer and comedian
 Phil Scott (born 1958), American politician, current governor of Vermont
 Phil Scott (footballer) (born 1961), former Australian rules footballer
 Phil Scott (boxer) (1900–1983), English heavyweight boxer
 Phil Scott (American football) (1906–1975), American football player
 Phil Scott (footballer, born 1942) (1942–2014), Northern Irish footballer
 Philip Scott (born 1974), retired Scottish footballer
 Phillip Scott (Virginia politician), American legislator